The 2014 South American Cross Country Championships took place on February 23, 2014.  The races were held on a 2000 metres circuit at the Jardín Botánico y Zoológico in Asunción, Paraguay.

A detailed report was written by CONSUDATLE,
and complete results were published.

Medallists

Race results

Senior men's race (12 km)

Junior (U20) men's race (8 km)

Youth (U18) men's race (6 km)

Senior women's race (8 km)

Junior (U20) women's race (6 km)

Youth (U18) women's race (3 km)

Medal table (unofficial)

Note: Totals include both individual and team medals, with medals in the team competition counting as one medal.

Participation
According to an unofficial count, 158 athletes from 8 countries participated.  This is in agreement with the official numbers as published.

 (12)
 (23)
 (9)
 (8)
 (10)
 (36)
 Perú (24)
 (36)

See also
 2014 in athletics (track and field)

References

External links
 Federación Paraguaya de Atletismo Official Results

South American Cross Country Championships
South American Cross Country Championships
South American Cross Country Championships
International athletics competitions hosted by Paraguay
Cross country running in Paraguay
February 2014 sports events in South America